The Youth and Development Party of Germany short-form: JED, was a minor political party in Germany. The party primarily focused on the interests of teenagers and young adults.

History 
The party was founded in 2017 by roughly 35 pupils from the Emsland Gymnasium in Rheine. The party was founded due to the founders viewing all other parties as "unelectable", highlighting the average age of politicians in the major political parties. 

The JED was dissolved in November 2019.

Program 
The JED wanted more funding for schools, a faster implementation of new media in the classroom, as well as a return to the G9 policy for gymnasiums. The party also wanted to raise HARZ IV and legalize the authorized distribution of recreational cannabis.

One of the co-founders of the party proposed a voting age of 14 in a 2019 interview.

Elections 
The JED only ever participated in the 2017 North Rhine-Westphalia state election, where it received 7,054 votes (0.1%). It was also recognized as a political party for the 2017 federal election but did not contest.

State elections

See also 

 PETO
 Youth politics
 List of political parties in Germany

Weblinks 
 Website of the JED (archived)
 Full JED party program (archived)
 Twitter account of the JED

References 

2017 establishments
2017 establishments in Germany
Defunct political parties in Germany
2019 disestablishments
2019 disestablishments in Germany
Social liberal parties
Cannabis activism
Youth-led organizations